The Bautz–Morgan classification was developed in 1970 by Laura P. Bautz and William Wilson Morgan to categorize galaxy clusters based on their morphology. It defines three main types: I, II, and III. Intermediate types (I-II, II-III) are also allowed. A type IV was initially proposed, but later redacted before the final paper was published.

Classification
 A type I cluster is dominated by a bright, large, supermassive cD galaxy; for example Abell 2029 and Abell 2199.
 A type II cluster contains elliptical galaxies whose brightness relative to the cluster is intermediate to that of type I and type III. The Coma Cluster is an example of a type II.
 A type III cluster has no remarkable members, such as the Virgo Cluster. Type III has two subdivisions, type IIIE and type IIIS
 Type IIIE clusters do not contain many giant spirals
 Type IIIS clusters contain many giant spirals
 The deprecated type IV was for clusters whose brightest members were predominantly spirals.

Examples

See also 
 Active galactic nucleus
 Galaxy morphological classification
 List of Abell clusters
 Planet
 Stellar classification

References 

Astronomical classification systems
Bautz-Morgan